Bill Pope, A.S.C. (born June 19, 1952) is an American cinematographer and filmmaker known for his collaborations with directors Sam Raimi, The Wachowskis and Edgar Wright. He has also photographed and directed numerous music videos for artists like Chris Isaak, Metallica and Drake, and eight episodes of the documentary series Cosmos: A Spacetime Odyssey.

Early life
Pope was born in Bowling Green, Kentucky. He attended College High School and New York University, where he received his master's degree in Fine Arts. Prior to graduation, Pope worked as the cinematographer on a student film entitled The Sixth Week which won an Oscar for Achievement in Documentary at the 5th Annual Student Academy Awards on May 21, 1978.

Filmography

Film

Television

Video games

Music videos
 1983 – "Hold Back the Night" by Aldo Nova
 1984 – "Bitchen Party" by Lopez Beatles
 1986 – "Nasty" by Janet Jackson
 1986 – "Mercy Street" by Peter Gabriel
 1986 – "Red Rain" by Peter Gabriel
 1987 – "We'll Be Together" by Sting
 1987 – "The Ledge" by The Replacements
 1988 – "In Your Room" by The Bangles
 1988 – "I Did It For Love" by Night Ranger
 1989 – "One" by Metallica
 1989 - "After All This Time" by Rodney Crowell
 1990 – "Without You" by Mötley Crüe
 1995 – "Somebody's Crying" by Chris Isaak
 1995 – "Go Walking Down There" by Chris Isaak
 1996 – "Graduation Day" by Chris Isaak
 2013 – "Hold On, We're Going Home" by Drake
 2014 – "Gust of Wind" by Pharrell Williams
 2018 – "Colors" by Beck

References

External links
 

1952 births
American cinematographers
Living people
People from Bowling Green, Kentucky